Savva Ivanovich Chevakinsky (1709 – aft. 1774) was a Russian architect of the Baroque school. He worked in Saint Petersburg and Tsarskoye Selo.

Chevakinsky was born into a noble family in the village of Veshki in the Novotorzhsky Uyezd of Tver Governorate. In 1729 he entered the Naval Academy in Saint Petersburg, from whence he was assigned to the Izmaylovsky Life Guards Regiment in 1734.

In 1739 Chevakinsky began his independent career. From 1741 to 1767 he was chief architect for the Admiralty Board. From 1745 to 1760 he was an architect at Tsarskoye Selo, supervising the reconstruction of the Catherine Palace and surrounding Catherine Park.

Chevakinsky's largest building in Saint Petersburg was the St. Nicholas Naval Cathedral (1753–1762) with a separate tiered bell tower (1756–1758). He also rebuilt the Kunstkamera, the museum of anthropology and ethnography established by Peter the Great.

Chevakinsky also designed large private homes. For the Sheremetev family, he built the Fountain House (1750–1755) on the Fontanka Embankment, which now houses the Anna Akhmatova Literary and Memorial Museum.

Chevakinsky also constructed the Cavalry Houses, a project commissioned by Empress Elizabeth centered on building houses that differentiated Pushkin, Saint Petersburg from the area surrounding the palace. Construction took place between 1752-1753.

From 1755 to 1758 Chevakinsky was an architect for the Imperial Academy of Sciences. During those years he taught Vasili Bazhenov and Ivan Starov.

According to some sources, Chevakinsky died between 1774 and 1780; according to other sources, he died in 1783.

External links
Savva Chevakinsky article at Tsarskoe Selo Museum 
Savva Chevakinsky article at the Tver Caravan 

People from Tver Oblast
Russian Baroque architects
1709 births
18th-century deaths
Year of death uncertain
Naval Cadet Corps alumni